Taguella is a flat bread, the staple dish of Tuareg people living in the Sahara. It is a disk-shaped bread made from wheat flour and cooked buried underneath the hot sand and charcoal of a small fire. The bread is then broken up into small pieces and eaten with a meat sauce.

Description
Served in a large flat, as a single dish or served with sheep meat, accompanied by goat, camel or sheep milk, and tea. The taguella is the emblematic dish of Tuaregs and also their food base.

The taguella is a thick, unleavened galette. It is made of semolina, wheat or millet, sometimes mixed with flour. After being kneaded (for twenty minutes) and then baked in the embers of a fire in ash and sand; with the right hand, Tuaregs eat it with a sauce of tomatoes and vegetables, or various meats, or chili or soup and sometimes flavored with wild fennel.

Quote

See also

Ash cake
Berber cuisine
Algerian cuisine

References

Tunisian cuisine
Algerian cuisine
Libyan cuisine
Malian cuisine
Tuareg
Morocco Sand Bread